The National Experimental University of Greater Caracas (UNEXCAA) is a public university in Venezuela. It is co-supervised by the Ministry of Popular Power for University Education, Science and Technology (MPPEUCT). Its campus is located in the La Floresta Urbanization, Chacao Parish, Municipality Chacao, east of the geographic center of Greater Caracas. The university was founded on 27 February 2018.

History

Origins 
The National Experimental University of Greater Caracas is a joint transformation of the University College Francisco de Miranda (CUFM), the University College Professor José Lorenzo Pérez Rodríguez (CUPJLPR), and the University College of Caracas (CUC).

The university's higher education center originates from managing National Training Programs (PNF), careers and Advanced Training Programs (PFA) authorized by the Office of Planning of the University Sector (OPSU), which formed the university's inaugural undergraduate academic area.

On 27 February 2018, Official Gazette Extraordinary No. 41,349, Presidential Decree No. 3,293 established the National Experimental University of Greater Caracas (UNEXCA), in agreement with the Alma Mater's mission, as a national experimental university, with legal status as a self-governing educational body, independent of the National Treasury.

On 1 August 2018, through Official Gazette No. 41,451, Professor Alí Ramón Rojas Olaya was appointed as the university's first rector.

Composition

Faculties

Economics and Social Sciences 
 School of Management.
 School of Public Accounting.
 School of Distribution and Logistics.
 School of Tourism.
 School of Social Work.

Education 
 School of Education.
 Special Education.
 Preschool Education.

Engineering 
 School of Computer Engineering.

National Training Programs 
 Administration.
 Public Accounting.
 Distribution and Logistics.
 Special Education.
 Informatics Engineering.
 Tourism.
 Accommodation Mention.
 Gastronomy Mention.
 Tourism Management Mention.
 Tourism Guidance Mention.

Associate degrees 
 Special Education.
 Preschool Education.
 Social Work.

Rector 
 Alí Ramón Rojas Oyala (2018–)

Agreements

Nationals 
 Banco Bicentenario

Services 

 Library.
 Coffeehouse.
 Dining room.
 Information and guidance.
 Internet.
 Classrooms.
 Informatics room.
 Medical service.
 Psychology service.
 Dental service.
 Transportation.

See also 

 Education in Venezuela
 List of universities in Venezuela
 National Training Programs

References

External links 
 cuc Colegio Universitario de Caracas-Official Site
 cupjlpr Colegio Universitario Profesor José Lorenzo Pérez Rodríguez-Official Site
 cufm Colegio Universitario Francisco de Miranda-Official Site
 Consejo Nacional de Universidades de Venezuela (Spanish)

Universities and colleges in Venezuela
Universities and colleges in Caracas